Deryck Beyleveld is founding Director of the Sheffield Institute of Biotechnological Law and Ethics (SIBLE) and is now a member of Durham CELLS (Centre for Ethics and Law in the Life Sciences). He is Professor of Law and Bioethics, and a former Head of Law School at Durham University. He is on the editorial board of Medical Law International.

Education
He was educated at the University of the Witwatersrand, Pembroke College, Cambridge, and completed his PhD at the University of East Anglia in 1975.

Career
Professor Beyleveld is the leading exponent of the moral theory of the late Alan Gewirth and, as such, his work has attracted extensive academic support and criticism. Over a long career he has collaborated with many academics, principally Professor Roger Brownsword, King's College London and Professor Shaun Pattinson, Durham University.

Bibliography
 Dialectical Necessity of Morality: An Analysis and Defense of Alan Gewirth's Argument to the Principle of Generic Consistency University of Chicago Press, 1991. 
 Human Dignity in Bioethics and Biolaw (with Roger Brownsword) Oxford University Press, 2002. 
The Sole Fact of Pure Reason (with Marcus Düwell) De Gruyter, 2020.

References

External links
 Staff profile at Durham University
 Durham CELLS

Year of birth missing (living people)
Living people
University of the Witwatersrand alumni
Alumni of Pembroke College, Cambridge
Alumni of the University of East Anglia
Academics of Durham University
Academics of the University of Sheffield
British legal scholars
Scholars of medical law